Godfrey Rockefeller may refer to:

 Godfrey A. Rockefeller (1924–2010), American aviator
 Godfrey Stillman Rockefeller (1899–1983), American financier
 Godfrey Lewis Rockefeller (1783–1857), American farmer and businessman